A miracle is an event that is inexplicable by natural or scientific laws and accordingly gets attributed to some supernatural or praeternatural cause.

Miracle(s) or The Miracle(s) may also refer to:

Literature
 Miracle (novel), a 2005 novel by Danielle Steel
 Miracle: A Celebration of New Life, a 2004 book by Anne Geddes and Céline Dion (see Music section below for the related album and song)
 Miracles (book), a 1947 non-fiction book by C. S. Lewis
 The Miracle, a 1984 novel by Irving Wallace

Theatre
 The Miracle (play), a 1911 German play by Karl Vollmöller, basis for at least two films (see below)
 The Miracle (musical), a 2006 American musical about the life and death of Jesus
 A Miracle, a 2009 play by Molly Davies

Film
(in date order)
 Das Mirakel, fp 15 December 1912: (US titles:The Miracle and Sister Beatrix), a German silent B&W film directed by Mime Misu, a pirate version of The Miracle (1912 film)
 The Miracle (1912 film), fp 21 December 1912: the world's first full-colour narrative feature film, directed by Antoine Carré and produced by Joseph Menchen, based on a play by Karl Vollmoeller
 The Miracle (1913 film), Swedish silent film
 "Il Miracolo" (The Miracle), controversial segment in the 1948 film L'Amore
 The Miracle (1959 film), Warner Bros. film based on Karl Vollmöller's play and the 1912 film; starring Carroll Baker and Roger Moore
 Miracle (1982 film) (Himala), Philippine film starring Nora Aunor and directed by Ishmael Bernal
 Miracles (1986 film), comedy starring Tom Conti and Teri Garr
 The Miracle (1987 film), French film
 Miracles (1989 film), Hong Kong action film starring, written by and directed by Jackie Chan
 The Miracle (1991 film), film directed by Neil Jordan
 Miracle (2004 film), film about the United States men's ice hockey victory at the 1980 Winter Olympics
 The Miracle (2009 film), Russian film
 The Miracle (2013 film), Korean short film
 The Miracle (2015 film), Turkish film
 The Miracle (2021 film), a South Korean film

Television
 Miracles (TV series), a 2003 American drama series
 "Miracles" (How I Met Your Mother), a 2008 episode
 "Miracles", an episode of the Australian children's series Lockie Leonard
 The Miracle, a 1985 UK television drama starring Keith Michell
 "The Miracle" (Roseanne), a 1997 episode
 CJIL-TV or The Miracle Channel, a Canadian Christian television station

Music
 The Miracles, an American musical group featuring Smokey Robinson
 Miracle (rapper) (born 1991), an Australian rapper
 Symphony No. 96 (Haydn) by Haydn, nicknamed "The Miracle"

Albums
(In date order)
 Miracles, a 1971 album by Yma Sumac
 Miracles (Change album), 1981
 Miracle (Willy DeVille album), 1987
 Miracle, a 1987 album by Kane Gang
 The Miracle (album), a 1989 album by Queen, and the title song (see below)
 Miracles: The Holiday Album, a 1994 album by Kenny G
 Miracle (Puff Johnson album), 1996
 Miracle (S.O.A.P. album), 2000
 Miracle (BoA album), 2002
 Miracle (Celine Dion album), and the title song (see below), 2004
 Miracle: Happy Summer from William Hung, a 2005 album by William Hung
 Miracles, a 2005 album by George Huff
 Miracle (Nonpoint album), 2010
 Miracle, a 2010 album by Robbie Seay Band
 Miracle (The Original Wailers EP), 2012
 Miracle (Third Day album), 2012
 Miracles (Two Steps from Hell album), 2014

Songs

Miracle
(in artist alphabetical order)
 "Miracle", by Audio Adrenaline from Worldwide
 "Miracle", by Beni Arashiro from Beni
 "Miracle", by Caravan Palace from Chronologic
 "Miracle" (Cascada song), 2006
 "Miracle" (Celine Dion song), 2004
 "Miracle" (Chvrches song), 2018
 "Miracle", by Dayna Manning from Shades, 2002
 "Miracle" (Foo Fighters song), 2006
 "Miracle", by Heavenly from Dust to Dust
 "Miracle" (Hurts song), 2013
 "Miracle" (Ilse DeLange song), 2009
 "Miracle" (Jon Bon Jovi song), 1990
 "Miracle" (Julian Perretta song), 2015
 "Miracle" (Kimbra song), 2014
 "Miracle" (KT Tunstall song), 2014
 "Miracle", by Little Big Town from Wanderlust
 "Miracle", by Matisyahu
 "Miracle", by Michael W. Smith from Sovereign
 "Miracle", by The Moody Blues from Sur la Mer
 "Miracle" (Nonpoint song), 2010
 "Miracle", by OceanLab from Sirens of the Sea
 "Miracle" (Olive song), 1996
 "Miracle", by Paramore from Riot!
 "Miracle" (Paula Seling and Ovi song), 2014
 "Miracle" (Samra Rahimli song), 2016
 "Miracle", by Sara Groves from Invisible Empires, 2011
 "Miracle", by Shinedown from Amaryllis
 "Miracle", by Sia from Music – Songs from and Inspired by the Motion Picture
 "Miracle" (Super Junior song), 2007
 "Miracle" (Whitney Houston song), 1991

The Miracle
(in artist alphabetical order}
 "The Miracle", by Cheap Trick from The Latest
 "The Miracle", by Cliff Richard from Real as I Wanna Be
 "The Miracle" (song), by Queen, 1989
 "The Miracle" The Shadows song, 1964  
 "The Miracle (of Joey Ramone)", by U2, 2014

Miracles
(in artist alphabetical order}
 "Miracles", by Audio Adrenaline from Sound of the Saints, 2015
 "Miracles" (Coldplay song), 2014
 "Miracles (Someone Special)" (Coldplay song), 2017
 "Miracles", by Colton Dixon from his self-titled EP, 2020
 "Miracles", by Dave Gahan from Hourglass
 "Miracles" (Don Williams song), 1981
 "Miracles", by Hawk Nelson from Miracles
 "Miracles" (Insane Clown Posse song), 2009
 "Miracles" (Jefferson Starship song), 1975
 "Miracles" by Joan Baez from Blowin' Away 1977
 "Miracles" (Ken Hirai song), 2001
 "Miracles", by LaVern Baker from LaVern
 "Miracles", by Mumzy Stranger from Now or Never, 2015
 "Miracles", by Nico & Vinz from Black Star Elephant
 "Miracles" (Pet Shop Boys song), 2003
 "Miracles", by Stacy Lattisaw from Sixteen
 "Miracles", by Stone Sour from Audio Secrecy

Sports
 Fort Myers Miracle, a former name of the American minor league baseball team now known as the Fort Myers Mighty Mussels
 Mike Bennett (wrestler), also known as "The Miracle"
 Amer al-Barqawi (born 1997), known by his alias Miracle-, a Dota player.

Places
 Miracle, Bell County, Kentucky, an unincorporated community in the United States
 Miracle, Lincoln County, Kentucky, an unincorporated community in the United States

Other uses
 Carnival Miracle, a cruise ship
 Miracle (dinghy), a sailboat designed by Jack Holt
 Miracle flatness in mathematics

See also
 MIRACL, Mid-Infrared Advanced Chemical Laser, a directed-energy weapon
 Miraculous: Tales of Ladybug & Cat Noir, a 2015 French-Korean-Japanese animated television series
 Man of Miracles (disambiguation)
 Miracle Man (disambiguation)
 Miracle match (disambiguation)
 
 

 Superstition (disambiguation)